Greatest Hits Volume II is American country music artist John Anderson's second compilation album. It was released on August 21, 1990 since he left Warner Bros. Records in 1986. before signing with BNA Records in 1991. The album includes ten singles that Anderson released for Warner between 1983 and 1988, starting with "Goin' Down Hill" in 1983 and ending with "Countrified" in 1986.

Track listing

References 

John Anderson (musician) albums
1990 greatest hits albums
Warner Records compilation albums